Chilostoma albanograeca is a species of medium-sized, air-breathing, land snail, a terrestrial pulmonate gastropod mollusk in the family Helicidae, the true snails. The species is endemic to Greece, and is defined as a Least-concern species.

References

Chilostoma
Fauna of Greece